Alonzo Russell (born 8 February 1992) is a Bahamian sprinter specialising in the 400 metres. He represented his country at the 2015 World Championships and 2016 World Indoor Championships, as well as the 2016 and 2020 Summer Olympics.

His personal bests in the event are 45.25 seconds outdoors (Nassau, BAAA Nationals 2016) and 46.38 seconds indoors (Clemson 2018).

Competition record

References

External links

1992 births
Living people
People from Freeport, Bahamas
People from West Grand Bahama
Bahamian male sprinters
Commonwealth Games medallists in athletics
Athletes (track and field) at the 2014 Commonwealth Games
Athletes (track and field) at the 2018 Commonwealth Games
Pan American Games competitors for the Bahamas
Athletes (track and field) at the 2015 Pan American Games
Athletes (track and field) at the 2019 Pan American Games
World Athletics Championships athletes for the Bahamas
Florida State Seminoles men's track and field athletes
Athletes (track and field) at the 2016 Summer Olympics
Olympic athletes of the Bahamas
Olympic bronze medalists for the Bahamas
Medalists at the 2016 Summer Olympics
Olympic bronze medalists in athletics (track and field)
Commonwealth Games silver medallists for the Bahamas
World Athletics Indoor Championships medalists
Competitors at the 2018 Central American and Caribbean Games
Athletes (track and field) at the 2020 Summer Olympics
Essex County College alumni
Florida State University alumni
Medallists at the 2014 Commonwealth Games
Medallists at the 2018 Commonwealth Games